Busycotypus is a genus of very large sea snails, marine gastropod mollusks in the subfamily Busycotypinae . 

In the United States, these are commonly known as whelks.

Species
 † Busycotypus calvertensis Petuch, 1988 
 Busycotypus canaliculatus (Linnaeus, 1758) (the channeled whelk)
Species brought into synonymy
 Busycotypus plagosus (Conrad, 1863): synonym of Fulguropsis plagosa (Conrad, 1863)
 Busycotypus spiratus (Conrad, 1863): synonym of Fulguropsis spirata (Lamarck, 1816)

References

 Hollister S.C. 1958, A review of the genus Busycon and its allies - Part I: Palaeontographica Americana IV(28): 48-126, pls. 8-18 page(s): 99
 Petuch E.J. (1994). Atlas of Florida fossil shells. Evanston, Illinois: Chicago Spectrum Press. 394 pp., 20 figs., 100 pls.
page(s): 317

External links 
 Jaxshell info at: 
  Kantor, Y.I., Fedosov, A.E., Kosyan, A.R., Puillandre, N., Sorokin, P.A., Kano, Y., Clark, R. N. & Bouchet, P. (2022) (nomenclatural availability: 2021). Molecular phylogeny and revised classification of the Buccinoidea (Neogastropoda). Zoological Journal of the Linnean Society. 194: 789-857

 
Busyconidae